Graham Michael Glasgow (born August 19, 1992) is an American football guard for the Detroit Lions of the National Football League (NFL). He played college football at Michigan. He was drafted by the Lions in the third round of the 2016 NFL Draft. He has previously played for the Denver Broncos.

College career

Glasgow came to Michigan as a walk-on in 2011, but earned a scholarship in the spring practice portion of the 2013 season. Glasgow appeared in 42 career games along the offensive line and made 37 starting assignments. Glasgow made a total of 22 starts at center (13 in 2015, nine in 2013) with his other 15 appearances coming at the guard position. Following the 2015 season, Glasgow was named the team's Hugh R. Rader Memorial Award recipient as the top offensive lineman and earned honorable mention All-Big Ten Conference accolades from both the coaches and media.

Professional career
Coming out of Michigan, Glasgow was projected by some analysts to be selected in the third or fourth round. He was ranked as the eighth-best offensive guard out of the 203 available by NFLDraftScout.com.

Detroit Lions

Glasgow was drafted in the third round with the 95th overall pick by the Detroit Lions in the 2016 NFL Draft. Halfway through the season he took over as the Lions starting left guard after struggles from former  first-round pick Laken Tomlinson.

In 2017, Glasgow was named the starting left guard, starting in all 16 games.

In 2018, Glasgow was named the starting center following the departure of Travis Swanson in free agency, and started all 16 games.

Denver Broncos
On March 23, 2020, Glasgow signed a four-year, $44 million contract with the Denver Broncos. He was placed on the reserve/COVID-19 list by the team on October 30, 2020, and activated on November 11.

In Week 9 of the 2021 season, Glasgow suffered an ankle injury and was placed on season-ending injured reserve on November 9, 2021.

On March 13, 2023, Glasgow was released by the Broncos.

Personal life
Graham Glasgow is married to Allison Davis. Glasgow is the older brother of defensive tackle Ryan Glasgow, with whom he was teammates with at Michigan and formerly played for the New Orleans Saints. Glasgow's second younger brother, Jordan Glasgow, is a linebacker who formerly played for the Indianapolis Colts.

Glasgow was arrested on March 15, 2014, for driving under the influence. On July 14, 2014, he was sentenced to one year of probation, after entering a guilty plea to operating while visibly impaired. He also received six days of community service and $885 in fines and court costs. On March 15, 2015, Graham violated his probation, and had six months added to his year-long probation, after registering a .086 on a breathalyzer test.

In April 2022, Glasgow became part-owner of Limitless, an Esports organization with teams in Rocket League, Valorant and Counter-Strike: Global Offensive.

References

External links

 

1992 births
Living people
American football centers
American football offensive guards
Denver Broncos players
Detroit Lions players
Michigan Wolverines football players
Sportspeople from Aurora, Illinois
Players of American football from Illinois